SROP may refer to:

 Sigreturn-oriented programming, a computer security exploit technique
 Sydney Region Outline Plan
 McNair SROP Michigan State University
 Schulich Research Opportunities Program